Plauche, or Plauché, is a surname. It may refer to:

Gary Plauché (1945–2014), Vigilante father who avenged the kidnapping and sexual assault of his son 
Jean Baptiste Plauché (1785–1860), Louisiana soldier and politician
Vance Plauché (1897–1976), American politician, attorney, member of United States House of Representatives
Jeremy Plauche (1987–present), American funny person and philanthropist